Andrés Gómez and Belus Prajoux were the defending champions, but Prajoux did not compete this year.

Gómez teamed up with Hans Gildemeister and successfully defended his title, by defeating Anders Järryd and Hans Simonsson 6–4, 6–2 in the final.

Seeds

Draw

Draw

References

External links
 Official results archive (ATP)
 Official results archive (ITF)

1982 Grand Prix (tennis)
ATP Bordeaux